The 2000 Cork Junior A Hurling Championship was the 103rd staging of the Cork Junior A Hurling Championship since its establishment by the Cork County Board in 1895. The championship began on 7 October 2000 and ended on 12 November 2000.

On 12 November 2000, Nemo Rangers won the championship following a 2-8 to 1-10 defeat of Ballinhassig in the final. This was their first championship title in the grade.

Nemo's Mark Cotter was the championship's top scorer with 1-14.

Qualification

Results

Quarter-finals

Ballinhassig received a bye to the semi-final stage.

Semi-finals

Final

Championship statistics

Top scorers

Overall

In a single game

References

Cork Junior Hurling Championship
Cork Junior Hurling Championship